Hazen is a city in Prairie County, Arkansas, United States. The population was 1,468 at the 2010 census.

Geography
Hazen is located at  (34.796306, -91.566536).

Included is a 0.25-mile wide strip of annexed land along Interstate 40, from Prairie County's western border to the White River. Nearby towns are Des Arc, De Valls Bluff, Ulm and Fredonia (Biscoe).

Demographics

2020 census

As of the 2020 United States census, there were 1,481 people, 601 households, and 397 families residing in the city.

2000 census
As of the census of 2000, there were 1,637 people, 658 households, and 461 families residing in the city. The racial makeup of the city was 80.57% White, 18.45% Black or African American, 0.55% Native American, and 0.43% from two or more races.  0.79% of the population were Hispanic or Latino of any race.

There were 658 households, out of which 30.7% had children under the age of 18 living with them, 54.4% were married couples living together, 12.8% had a female householder with no husband present, and 29.8% were non-families. 27.4% of all households were made up of individuals, and 12.9% had someone living alone who was 65 years of age or older.  The average household size was 2.38 and the average family size was 2.88.

In the city, the population was spread out, with 24.4% under the age of 18, 6.5% from 18 to 24, 25.7% from 25 to 44, 22.2% from 45 to 64, and 21.1% who were 65 years of age or older.  The median age was 41 years. For every 100 females there were 90.3 males.  For every 100 females age 18 and over, there were 82.1 males.

The median income for a household in the city was $29,800, and the median income for a family was $35,990. Males had a median income of $28,958 versus $19,792 for females. The per capita income for the city was $14,805.  About 13.1% of families and 13.8% of the population were below the poverty line, including 12.5% of those under age 18 and 18.6% of those age 65 or over.

Education 
Public education for elementary and secondary school students is provided by the Hazen School District, which leads to graduation from Hazen High School.  The district and high school mascot and athletic emblem is the Hornet with purple and white serving as the school colors.

Climate
The climate in this area is characterized by hot, humid summers and generally mild to cool winters.  According to the Köppen Climate Classification system, Hazen has a humid subtropical climate, abbreviated "Cfa" on climate maps.

Notable people
Gary Wayne Betzner, former US Navy pilot, civic leader, and convicted drug smuggler employed by Pablo Escobar and the CIA during the Iran-Contra affair
John Hancock, an American film and television actor, born in Hazen in 1941
Bill Sample, Republican member of both houses of the Arkansas General Assembly from Hot Springs, born in Hazen in 1946
Samuel Weems, far-right disgraced lawyer and perennial mayoral candidate turned Armenian genocide denier, born in Hazen in 1936

References

 
Cities in Arkansas
Cities in Prairie County, Arkansas